Badenia was a  coaster that was built in 1912 by F Schichau GmbH, Elbing for German owners. She was renamed Titania in 1939. She was seized by the Allies at Rendsburg in May 1945, passed to the Ministry of War Transport (MoWT) and renamed Empire Conexe. In 1947, she was sold into merchant service and renamed Ringdove, serving until 1950 when she was scrapped.

Description
The ship was built in 1912 by F Schichau GmbH, Elbing.

She had a GRT of 921 and a NRT of 510.

The engine was built by F Schichau.

History
Badenia was built for A Kirsten, Hamburg. Her port of registry was Cologne and the Code Letters HWCM were allocated. By 1930, she had been sold to Kölner Reederei AG and was being operated under the management of Edmund Halm & Co. In 1932, she was sold to Rhein-London Linie GmbH. In 1934, her Code Letters were changed to DGWA. In 1939, Badenia was renamed Titania. This change was not recorded by Lloyds Register, she continued to be listed as Badenia.

In May 1945, Titania was seized by the Allies at Rendsburg. She was passed to the MoWT and renamed Empire Conexe. In 1947, she was sold to the General Steam Navigation Co Ltd and renamed Ringdove. She served until 1950 when she was scrapped at Bo'ness, West Lothian.

References

1912 ships
Ships built in Elbing
Steamships of Germany
Merchant ships of Germany
World War I merchant ships of Germany
World War II merchant ships of Germany
Ministry of War Transport ships
Empire ships
Steamships of the United Kingdom
Merchant ships of the United Kingdom
Ships built by Schichau